Ivar Kristiansen Hognestad (16 October 1888 – 30 April 1973) was a Norwegian politician for the Labour Party.

He was born in Time.

He was elected to the Norwegian Parliament from Rogaland in 1934, and was re-elected on four occasions.

Hognestad held various positions in Time municipality council in the periods 1919–1922, 1928–1940 and 1947–1952.

References

1888 births
1973 deaths
People from Time, Norway
Labour Party (Norway) politicians
Members of the Storting
20th-century Norwegian politicians